The 2012 Betfair World Matchplay was the 19th annual staging of the World Matchplay, organised by the Professional Darts Corporation. The tournament took place from 21 to 29 July 2012 at the Winter Gardens, Blackpool.

Phil Taylor was the defending champion, and retained his title for the fifth successive time and thirteenth in total with an 18–15 win over James Wade in the final.

Two nine-dart finishes were made during the tournament. Michael van Gerwen recorded the first during his second round victory over Steve Beaton. Wes Newton repeated the feat a day later, during his second round loss against Justin Pipe. This was the third consecutive year that at least one nine-dart finish was thrown in the Matchplay.

Prize money
For the fourth consecutive World Matchplay, the prize fund was £400,000.

Qualification
The top 16 in the PDC Order of Merit qualified as seeded players. The other 16 places went to the top 16 non-qualified players from the PDC ProTour Order of Merit who are unseeded players.

PDC Top 16

  Phil Taylor (winner)
  Adrian Lewis (quarter-finals)
  James Wade (runner-up)
  Gary Anderson (first round)
  Wes Newton (second round)
  Simon Whitlock (first round)
  Raymond van Barneveld (second round)
  Andy Hamilton (quarter-finals)
  Mark Webster (second round)
  Terry Jenkins (semi-finals)
  Kevin Painter (first round)
  Justin Pipe (quarter-finals)
  Dave Chisnall (first round)
  Mark Walsh (second round)
  Paul Nicholson (first round)
  Vincent van der Voort (first round)

PDC ProTour qualifiers

  Kim Huybrechts (first round)
  Michael van Gerwen (quarter-finals)
  Ronnie Baxter (semi-finals)
  Colin Lloyd (first round)
  Andy Smith (second round)
  Ian White (second round)
  Brendan Dolan (first round)
  Michael Smith (first round)
  Richie Burnett (first round)
  Mervyn King (first round)
  Robert Thornton (first round)
  Colin Osborne (first round)
  James Hubbard (first round)
  Dean Winstanley (second round)
  Steve Beaton (second round)
  Joe Cullen (first round)

Draw

Statistics
{|class="wikitable sortable" style="font-size: 95%; text-align: right"
|-
! Player
! Eliminated
! Played
! Legs Won
! Legs Lost
! LWAT
! 100+
! 140+
! 180s
! High checkout
! 3-dart average
|-
|align="left"|  Phil Taylor
| Winner
| 5
| 74
| 47
| 29
| 158
| 81
| 28
| 170 (x2)
| 100.44
|-
|align="left"|   James Wade
| Final
| 5
| 71
| 55
| 29
| 179
| 95
| 29
| 164
| 98.57
|-
|align="left"|  Terry Jenkins
| Semi-finals
| 4
| 55
| 48
| 19
| 139
| 90
| 24
| 140
| 94.95
|-
|align="left"|  Ronnie Baxter
| Semi-finals
| 4
| 49
| 43
| 16
| 133
| 63
| 19
| 150
| 94.33
|-
|align="left"|  Michael van Gerwen
| Quarter-finals
| 3
| 36
| 31
| 14
| 94
| 47
| 14
| 141
| 101.14
|-
|align="left"|  Adrian Lewis
| Quarter-finals
| 3
| 35
| 23
| 12
| 75
| 36
| 19
| 149
| 96.26
|-
|align="left"|  Justin Pipe
| Quarter-finals
| 3
| 34
| 30
| 11
| 83
| 47
| 19
| 132
| 93.55
|-
|align="left"|  Andy Hamilton
| Quarter-finals
| 3
| 34
| 29
| 14
| 62
| 33
| 22
| 127
| 95.25
|-
|align="left"|  Steve Beaton
| Second round
| 2
| 19
| 19
| 5
| 58
| 20
| 9
| 90
| 98.23
|-
|align="left"|  Wes Newton
| Second round
| 2
| 20
| 18
| 8
| 38
| 31
| 12
| 144
| 97.61
|-
|align="left"|  Raymond van Barneveld
| Second round
| 2
| 20
| 17
| 6
| 54
| 25
| 11
| 109
| 94.67
|-
|align="left"|  Dean Winstanley
| Second round
| 2
| 21
| 24
| 7
| 50
| 33
| 17
| 127
| 94.31
|-
|align="left"|  Ian White
| Second round
| 2
| 13
| 18
| 2
| 36
| 22
| 8
| 164
| 92.09
|-
|align="left"|  Andy Smith
| Second round
| 2
| 17
| 19
| 5
| 51
| 24
| 6
| 100
| 89.40
|-
|align="left"|  Mark Walsh
| Second round
| 2
| 14
| 21
| 6
| 57
| 23
| 7
| 126
| 88.80
|-
|align="left"|  Mark Webster
| Second round
| 2
| 16
| 19
| 7
| 44
| 15
| 6
| 116
| 87.16
|-
|align="left"|  Kim Huybrechts
| First round
| 1
| 9
| 11
| 2
| 35
| 15
| 4
| 167
| 98.69
|-
|align="left"|  Mervyn King
| First round
| 1
| 8
| 10
| 1
| 26
| 12
| 8
| 101
| 97.54
|-
|align="left"|  Dave Chisnall
| First round
| 1
| 7
| 10
| 4
| 21
| 7
| 7
| 170
| 95.49
|-
|align="left"|  Richie Burnett
| First round
| 1
| 5
| 10
| 2
| 20
| 12
| 4
| 76
| 95.09
|-
|align="left"|  Simon Whitlock
| First round
| 1
| 6
| 10
| 2
| 23
| 8
| 3
| 115
| 92.08
|-
|align="left"|  Gary Anderson
| First round
| 1
| 11
| 13
| 4
| 22
| 16
| 8
| 120
| 89.77
|-
|align="left"|  Colin Osborne
| First round
| 1
| 8
| 10
| 4
| 25
| 8
| 2
| 96
| 88.66
|-
|align="left"|  Brendan Dolan
| First round
| 1
| 7
| 10
| 1
| 23
| 12
| 1
| 117
| 85.60
|-
|align="left"|  Vincent van der Voort
| First round
| 1
| 5
| 10
| 0
| 14
| 9
| 4
| 84
| 92.86
|-
|align="left"|  James Hubbard
| First round
| 1
| 5
| 10
| 2
| 22
| 4
| 5
| 88
| 90.21
|-
|align="left"|  Kevin Painter
| First round
| 1
| 6
| 10
| 1
| 23
| 12
| 1
| 160
| 88.01
|-
|align="left"|  Joe Cullen
| First round
| 1
| 4
| 10
| 1
| 16
| 8
| 4
| 170
| 92.91
|-
|align="left"|  Michael Smith
| First round
| 1
| 4
| 10
| 0
| 15
| 8
| 3
| 126
| 90.70
|-
|align="left"|  Colin Lloyd
| First round
| 1
| 6
| 10
| 3
| 19
| 9
| 3
| 140
| 84.80
|-
|align="left"|  Paul Nicholson
| First round
| 1
| 6
| 10
| 2
| 23
| 6
| 3
| 100
| 83.85
|-
|align="left"|  Robert Thornton
| First round
| 1
| 0
| 10
| 0
| 17
| 3
| 1
| –
| 88.17

References

External links
 Official site

World Matchplay (darts)
World Matchplay Darts
World Matchplay (darts)
World Matchplay (darts)